is a Japanese light novel series written by Tōki Yanagimi and illustrated by Kippu. Fujimi Shobo have published eleven volumes since May 2012 under their Fujimi Fantasia Bunko imprint. A manga adaptation with art by Sutarō Hanao was serialized in Fujimi Shobo's shōnen manga magazine Monthly Dragon Age between 2012 and 2014, and was collected in three tankōbon volumes. A second manga adaptation by Yohei Yasumura began serialization in Media Factory's seinen manga magazine Monthly Comic Alive from January 2015 and Seven Seas Entertainment published the manga in English. A 12-episode anime television series adaptation by Silver Link aired between October and December 2015.

Characters

 
 The leader of the 35th Test Platoon. While inexperienced as a commanding officer, he always looks after the well-being of his squad and tries to make the new members feel welcome. He is the only male member of his team and every member of his team has some attraction towards him as he has promised to each of them separately that he would share half of their burdens. A master swordsman capable of slicing bullets, one of the few things that anger him is insulting that he prefers a katana and is no good with magic or guns. He forms a contract with the Relic Eater Lapis since his skills are impressive enough to use her full potential and like all other contractors, gains the ability to enter a state called "Demon Slayer Mode." At the end of the anime series, he enters a modified, more powerful state called "God Slayer Mode" to save his sister's life.

 
 A prodigy of the Inquisition who's demoted to 35th Test Platoon for excessive killing. Ouka excels at any type of combat, and possesses skills allowing her to act alone, she at first didn't care about teamwork, but eventually starts to trust her platoon. Since a Witch killed her family, she hates magic and witches (until ending), and that leads to a mutual disliking towards Mari. She has a temporary contract with a Relic Eater in the form of twin guns named Vlad. At the end of the anime series, she makes the contract permanent to protect Takeru's sister and prevent Takeru from killing her.

 
 The sniper of the thirty-fifth platoon. A girl from a high class family, she is very emotional and suffers from a horrible stage fright, that causes major incidents and mistakes. She wears an accessory in her hair that looks like rabbit ears which are her trademark, and is often teased by other members of the platoon. She uses the Barrett anti-materiel sniper rifle as her sniping weapon.

 
 A first year student at the academy, she is the mod-maker of the platoon. A genius when it comes to maintaining and creating weapons, fiddling with machines, and hacking. She often gathers intelligence via hacking, illegally remodels the unit's weapons, and sexually harasses others, as well as other countless troublesome activities.

 
 A young witch previously affiliated with Valhalla, who tricked her into helping them out with their criminal activities. Possessor of『Aurora』ancient magic attribute, she specializes in high-powered destructive magic, and can cast restorative, summoning, and defensive magic. After her memory is erased by Haunted, she's put under the watch of the 35th Test Platoon.

 
 The eccentric Chairman of Anti-Magic Academy and the head of the Inquisitors of Heretics Office. He's also Ōka's guardian. He assigns Ouka to the 35th Test Platoon with a certain expectation.

 The strongest witch hunter.

 Sister of Ikaruga Suginami. She was killed by Haunted.

 
 A Human shaped "Relic Eater," or Magical Heritage girl known as Malleus Maleficarum Type-Twilight "Mistilteinn." Sōgetsu Ōtori has her assume the identity of Takeru's fictional sister to account for her presence in the school. Her transformation is restricted to any kind of bladed weapon, particularly swords. When Takeru is on the verge of death, she chooses him to become her host. She is normally very reserved and shows little expression, but the truth is she is very prideful, and she gets jealous whenever Takeru uses other weapons. Her name is the shortened form for lapis lazuli.

 
 A dangerous Magic user from Valhalla and former Catholic priest who used to work with Mari, until he framed her for murder and then erased her memory. He is a magician who can control dead spirits, perform summons, and perform alchemy, but his personal history is completely unknown. He loves despair, and his reason for living is to cause others to feel despair.

 
 The 17-year-old student council president of the Anti-Magic Academy. She is very small so she doesn't look her age. She is cheerful and is always wearing a smiling expression.

 
 She is the younger sister of Takeru Kusanagi. She is very strong and possesses the body of a demon. She also seems to have a "brother complex" shown when she gets jealous due to the other girls in his squad trying to gain his affection.

Media

Light novels
The first light novel volume was published by Fujimi Shobo under their Fujimi Fantasia Bunko imprint on May 19, 2012. A total of thirteen volumes and one side story volume have been released, with the final volume released on July 20, 2016.

Manga

Anime
A 12-episode anime television series adaptation by Silver Link aired between October 7 and December 23, 2015.

References

External links
 
 

2012 Japanese novels
2015 anime television series debuts
Anime and manga based on light novels
Crunchyroll anime
Discotek Media
Fujimi Fantasia Bunko
Fujimi Shobo manga
Kadokawa Dwango franchises
Japanese fantasy novels
Light novels
Media Factory manga
Medialink
Military anime and manga
Seinen manga
Seven Seas Entertainment titles
Shōnen manga
Silver Link
Supernatural anime and manga